Jonathan Sturges (August 23, 1740 – October 4, 1819) was an American lawyer, jurist and politician from Fairfield, Connecticut. He represented Connecticut as a delegate to the Continental Congress and in the United States House of Representatives.

Early life
Sturges was born in Fairfield in the Connecticut Colony where his father, Samuel (1712–1771) was a surveyor. His mother, Ann (Burr) Sturges was Samuel's second wife. His great-great grandfather, also Jonathan Sturges (1624–1700), was one of the original settlers of the town.

Sturges graduated from Yale in 1759. He earned his master's degree from Yale in 1761, and his Doctor of Laws degree from Yale in 1806. He read law, and was admitted to the bar in May 1772. He began the practice of law in Fairfield.

Career
Sturges' entry into public service came when his neighbors in Fairfield sent him to the Connecticut House of Representatives in 1772. He was returned every year until 1784. In 1773 he served Fairfield County as a justice of the peace, and in 1775 he served as the judge of probate court.
Connecticut sent him as a delegate to the Continental Congress in 1786. He served as a member of the Connecticut Council of Assistants from 1786 to 1788.

When the new United States government was formed, the voters elected him to the U.S. House as a Pro-Administration Party candidate. He served two terms in Congress from March 4, 1789 to March 3, 1793. Upon returning home, he was appointed an Associate Justice of the Connecticut Supreme Court, serving from 1793 until 1805. He was a presidential elector in 1797 and 1805.

Sturges died at his home in Fairfield on October 4, 1819, and is interred in the Old Burying Ground in Fairfield.

Personal life
In 1760 Sturges married Deborah Lewis (1742–1832). They had four children together:
Lewis Burr Sturges (1763–1844)
Jonathan Sturges
Barnabas Lathrop Sturges
Priscilla Sturges.

Their son, Lewis Burr Sturges, would follow his father in the U.S. Congress.

Jonathan Sturges, an important arts patron in New York City, was his grandson.

References

External links 

 
 Biographical Directory of the United States Congress: STURGES, Jonathan, (1740 - 1819)
 
 The Political Graveyard: Sturges, Jonathan (1740-1819)
 Govtrack.us: Rep. Jonathan Sturges

1740 births
1819 deaths
Continental Congressmen from Connecticut
18th-century American politicians
Members of the United States House of Representatives from Connecticut
Yale College alumni
Lawyers from Fairfield, Connecticut
Members of the Connecticut General Assembly Council of Assistants (1662–1818)
American lawyers admitted to the practice of law by reading law
19th-century American lawyers
Jonathan